Lincolnwood High School is a public high school located in Raymond in Montgomery County, Illinois serving Panhandle Community Unit School District 2, located in Montgomery, Christian and Macoupin Counties. The school was created in 1962 with the consolidation of the Farmersville, Harvel, Raymond, and Waggoner High Schools. The present campus opened in 1972. There is an ongoing discussion about the possible consolidation with the adjacent Morrisonville Community Unit School District 1, located mostly in Christian County, and there have also been talks concerning the possible consolidation of those two districts with Nokomis Community Unit School District 22.

Student organizations

Local Organizations

 Band
 Chorus
 Drama Club
 Lincolnwood Legend (Yearbook)
 Spanish Club
 Tech Club
 Student Council

National Organizations
 FFA
 Lincolnwood Community Service Organization
 National Honor Society
 SADD

Interscholastic athletics & activities
Lincolnwood High School sponsors teams named the Lancers that compete as members of the Illinois High School Association (IHSA) and the MSM Conference:

Boys sports
 Baseball 
 Basketball 
 Golf
 Soccer
 (Football in co-op with Pawnee)

Girls sports
 Cheerleading
 Golf
 Softball
 Volleyball
 (Basketball in co-op with Pawnee)Activities Scholastic Bowl

The baseball team won the 2009 IHSA Class 1A State Championship'''. Since the school was formed by consolidation in 1962, it has won 8 Regional, 3 Sectional, 1 Super-Sectional, and 1 State title.

The boys basketball team has won 8 Regional championships, and the 1972 team also won the Sectional and Super-Sectional titles en route to a 3rd-place finish in the IHSA Class A State Championships.

The volleyball team has claimed 3 District, 12 Regional, 4 Sectional, and 1 Super-Sectional championships, with the 1985 team advancing to the first round of the IHSA State Championship Tournament.

The boys golf team has won 3 Regional and 2 Sectional championships, and the softball team has claimed 5 Regional titles.

External links
 Lincolnwood website

References

Public high schools in Illinois
Schools in Montgomery County, Illinois
Education in Montgomery County, Illinois